The Final Adventures of Solar Pons is a collection of detective science fiction short stories by author August Derleth.  It was released in 1998 by Mycroft & Moran.  It was a collection of Derleth's Solar Pons stories which are pastiches of the Sherlock Holmes tales of Arthur Conan Doyle.

Contents

The Final Adventures of Solar Pons contains the following tales:

 "Introduction", by Peter Ruber
 "Reception in Elysium" (poem) by Mary F. Lindsley
 Terror Over London [novel]
 "The Adventures of Gresham Old Place"
 "The Adventure of the Burlstone Horror"
 "The Adventure of the Viennese Musician"
 "The Adventure of the Muttering Man"
 "The Adventure of the Two Collaborators", by Peter Ruber 
 "The Adventure of the Nosferatu" (with Mack Reynolds)
 "The Adventure of the Extra-Terrestrial" (with Mack Reynolds)
 "More from Dr. Parker's Notebooks"

Sources

1998 short story collections
Mystery short story collections
Sherlock Holmes pastiches
Science fiction short story collections by August Derleth
Solar Pons